The non-marine molluscs of Uzbekistan are a part of the wildlife of Uzbekistan. Uzbekistan is land-locked and has no marine molluscs, only land and freshwater species, including snails, slugs, and freshwater bivalves.

Freshwater gastropods 

Neritidae
 Theodoxus pallasi Lindholm, 1924

Hydrobiidae
 Caspiohydrobia behningi Starobogatov & Andreeva, 1981
 Caspiohydrobia grimmi Clessin, 1888
 Caspiohydrobia pavlovskii Starobogatov & Izzatullaev, 1974
 Caspiohydrobia sogdiana Starobogatov & Izzatullaev, 1974 - possibly locally extinct
 Bythiospeum
 Valvatamnicola archangelskii Zhadin, 1952

Valvatidae
 Valvata piscinalis (O. F. Müller, 1774)

Lymnaeidae
 Galba truncatula (Müller, 1774)
 Lymnaea stagnalis (Linnaeus, 1758)
 Lymnaea rectilabrum (Annandale & Prashad, 1919)
 Lymnaea tenera (Küster, 1863)
 Radix auricularia (Linnaeus, 1758)

Planorbidae
 Anisus septemgyratus (Rossmässler, 1835)
 Anisus spirorbis (Linnaeus, 1758)
 Kolhymorbis dildorae Izzatullaev, 1980
 Planorbarius corneus (Linnaeus, 1758)
 Planorbis planorbis (Linnaeus, 1758)

Physidae
 Physa fontinalis (Linnaeus, 1758)

Land gastropods 

Cochlicopidae
 Cochlicopa dushanbensis Starobogatov, 1996

Freshwater bivalves

Unionidae
 Anodonta cyrea Drouët, 1881

Corbiculidae
 Corbicula producta von Martens, 1905

Sphaeriidae
 Euglesa gurvichi Starobogatov & Izzatullaev, 1985
 Sphaerium corneum  	(Linnaeus, 1758)

Dreissenidae
 Dreissena caspia Eichwald, 1855 - possibly locally extinct
 Dreissena polymorpha Pallas, 1771

See also
Lists of molluscs of surrounding countries:
 List of non-marine molluscs of Kazakhstan
 List of non-marine molluscs of Tajikistan
 List of non-marine molluscs of Kyrgyzstan
 List of non-marine molluscs of Afghanistan
 List of non-marine molluscs of Turkmenistan

References

Molluscs

Molluscs
Uzbekistan
Uzbekistan